Alexander Deuchar (1777 – 12 August 1844) was a seal engraver who revived the Templar tradition in Scotland in the early 19th century in order to establish a new form of chivalry. The Deuchar family had been Jacobite sympathisers, but transferred their allegiance to the Hanoverian cause before 1745, when a prominent Jacobite, Lyon of Easter Ogil, carried off the great sword of Deuchar, although it was recovered after the Battle of Culloden in 1746, and in the possession of Alexander when he started his revival of the Scottish Knights Templar. The new Order started formally in 1805 when a charter was issued to Deuchar by the Early Grand Encampment of Ireland (previously the High Knight Templars of Ireland Lodge, Kilwinning Lodge, and itself operating under a charter from the Grand Master of Lodge Mother Kilwinning, in Ayrshire), under the title of the Edinburgh Encampment No. 31. It became the Grand Assembly of Knights Templar in Edinburgh.

Deuchar's brother, David, who was serving in the 1st Regiment of Foot, The Royal Scots (The Royal Regiment), joined with other officers of the Regiment. In 1809 Alexander began, with Major Mueller of the same regiment, to request authority from the Duke of Kent, Grand Master of the Order in England, for a charter for a new Grand Conclave.  The charter was granted, finally, on 19 June 1811, for the "Grand Conclave of Knights of the Holy Temple and Sepulcher, and of St. John of Jerusalem, H.R.D.M. + K.D.S.H.". David Deuchar served in the Peninsular War (1808–14) in the 3rd Battalion of the 1st Regiment of Foot of The Royal Scots and during the campaign in Portugal took the altar cross from the Templar Church at the Castle of Tomar, which had been destroyed by the French, and presented the Cross at the inauguration of the Conclave. Somewhat controversially, Alexander Deuchar opened membership of the Conclave to  non-Masons, and issued charters to Encampments which were non-Masonic.

References

 Gardner, Laurence (Foreword), The Forgotten Monarchy of Scotland Element Books Ltd;  p243/244 
 A Catalogue of the books and manuscripts of the late Alexander Deuchar
 Great Priory of Scotland
 Scotsman Heritage Article on Templars in Scotland
 Supreme Grand Royal Arch Chapter of Scotland
 Reference to David Deuchar service in 1st Royal Regiment

External links
 New Encyclopedia of Freemasonry 1921 by Arthur Edward Waite Pages 231-232  
"In 1811-1812, Alexander Deuchar, Eminent Commander of Edinburgh Encampment, No 31, under the Early Grand Constitution, established what is termed a schismatic body with the style and title of the Supreme Grand Conclave of Scotland. He is said to have assumed the Office of Grand Master for life, notwithstanding the displeasure  of his associates. The Conclave appears to have been moribund in 1830. In 1836 it was remodelled, vacating its Masonic position and admitting non-Masons to membership, including the Bishop of Aberdeen and the Duke of Leeds."
 The Royal Masonic Cyclopaedia 1877 by Kenneth R H MacKenzie Page 156. Reprinted 1997, Kessinger Publishing. 
"DEUCHAR CHARTERS.-So called from Alexander Deuchar, an engraver, who was the principal mover in the establishment of the Grand Conclave of Knight Templar in Scotland, and its first Grand Master in the early part of this century. Deuchar seems to have become acquainted with Knights Templarism, in consequence of communications he had with Fratres serving in the Shropshire Militia, who had been dubbed under a warrant emanating from Dublin. This corps was quartered in Edinburgh in 1798 ; and from the Fratres of this corps it is most probable that the first Grand Assembly of Knights Templar was opened in Edinburgh ; this, however gave place to the Grand Assembly of High Knights Templar, working Under a charter No 31 from the Early Grand Encampment of Ireland, of which Deuchar was Grand Master.  But these Deuchar Charters were clearly extra-Masonic, as they authorised Encampments to install Knights Templar and Knights of St John of Jerusalem, on the one condition that that such Encampments should not hold any communion or intercourse with any Chapter or Encampment, or body assuming that name, holding meetings of Knights Templar, under a Master Mason's Charter This body, however, lost its authority, in consequence of having nothing over which to exercise it, about 1837."
 TemplarHistory.com
 Multimap.com Easter Ogil and Deuchar, Angus

1777 births
1844 deaths
18th-century engravers
19th-century engravers
Scottish engravers
Royal Scots officers
British Army personnel of the Napoleonic Wars
19th-century Scottish people